Akron is the Statutory Town that is the county seat and the most populous municipality of Washington County, Colorado, United States.  The town population was 1,757 at the 2020 United States Census.

History
Akron was platted in 1882. The community was named after Akron, Ohio, the native home of the wife of a railroad employee. The town was incorporated in 1887.

Geography 
Akron is located at  (40.161530, -103.211850), at the intersection of U.S. Highway 34 and State Highway 63.

Demographics 

At the 2000 census there were 1,711 people in 734 households, including 457 families, in the town. The racial makeup of the town was 93.51% White, 0.12% African American, 1.23% Native American, 0.12% Asian, 0.06% Pacific Islander, 4.32% from other races, and 0.64% from two or more races. Hispanic or Latino of any race were 11.75%.

Of the 734 households 29.3% had children under the age of 18 living with them, 50.8% were married couples living together, 9.4% had a female householder with no spouse present, and 37.7% were non-families. 33.8% of households were one person and 16.8% were one person aged 65 or older.  The average household size was 2.28 and the average family size was 2.94.

The age distribution was 26.2% under the age of 18, 6.3% from 18 to 24, 23.4% from 25 to 44, 21.0% from 45 to 64, and 23.1% 65 or older.  The median age was 40 years. For every 100 females, there were 97.3 males.  For every 100 females age 18 and over, there were 89.8 males.

The median household income was $29,420 and the median family income was $35,156. Males had a median income of $25,875 versus $21,000 for females. The per capita income for the town was $15,772.  About 8.1% of families and 11.0% of the population were below the poverty line, including 13.9% of those under age 18 and 11.3% of those age 65 or over.

Climate
Akron experiences a semi-arid climate (Köppen BSk) with cold, dry winters and hot, dry summers.

See also

Colorado
Bibliography of Colorado
Index of Colorado-related articles
Outline of Colorado
List of counties in Colorado
List of municipalities in Colorado
List of places in Colorado

References

External links

Town of Akron website
CDOT map of the Town of Akron

Towns in Washington County, Colorado
Towns in Colorado
County seats in Colorado